Proline/serine-rich coiled-coil protein 1 is a protein that in humans is encoded by the PSRC1 gene.

This gene encodes a proline-rich protein. Studies of the related mouse gene suggest that this gene is regulated by p53 and may participate in p53-mediated growth suppression. Alternatively spliced transcript variants encoding different isoforms have been described.

References

Further reading